Berrian may refer to:

Places 
Berrian Mountain, mountain in Jefferson County, Colorado
Berrian, Washington, unincorporated community in Benton County, Washington, United States

People with surname 
 Bernard Berrian (born 1980), American football player
 Tony Berrian (born 1979), American sprinter

See also 
 Berrien (disambiguation)